Highly unusual methods (also HUM) is a class of contract bridge bidding systems defined by the World Bridge Federation.  Usually these are artificial systems that require advance preparation to contend with, and are restricted to the highest levels of tournament play in most locations.  These systems are designated by a yellow sticker, and are more regulated than brown sticker conventions.

The current definition of the WBF lists the following HUM:
 a pass in the opening position shows at least the values generally accepted for an opening bid of one, even if there are alternative weak possibilities (a strong pass system),
 by partnership agreement an opening bid at the one level may be weaker than pass,
 by partnership agreement an opening bid at the one level may be made with values a king or more below average strength,
 by partnership agreement an opening bid at the one level shows either length or shortage in a specified suit, or
 by partnership agreement an opening bid at the one level shows either length in one specified suit or length in another.

With the exception to the above being an opening of one of a minor in a strong club or strong diamond system.

See also
Bridge convention

References
Regulations and definition from World Bridge Federation

Bridge systems